The Territory of the Comoros was a French overseas territory consisting of the four main Comoro Islands (Grande Comore, Mohéli, Anjouan and Mayotte) that existed from 1946 to 1975. It was part of the French Union under the Fourth Republic, then part of the French Community established by the Constitution of the Fifth Republic from 1958.

In 1975 , following a referendum, the territory was divided - the islands of Grande Comore, Mohéli and Anjouan became independent under the new Union of the Comoros, while Mayotte voted to remain a French overseas territory, and later became the 101st French department in 2011.

History

Establishment 

In June 1843, Mayotte became the first of the Comoro Islands to become a French colony. In the 1880s and 1890s, the three other islands - Grande Comore, Anjouan and Mohéli - became French protectorates in 1886, 1887 and 1892, respectively  In 1912, these three islands became colonies as well.

Between 1912 and 1946, all four islands were governed with Madagascar as the Colony of Madagascar and Dependencies.

In 1946, the Comoros archipelago became a French overseas territory with its capital in Dzaoudzi, Mayotte. The Territorial Assembly of the Comoros was founded, with representatives from all four islands.

1950s and 1960s 
In 1952, Comoros established its own customs regime.  In 1958, a referendum was held in which Comorans overwhelmingly voted in favour of remaining part of France. Following this referendum, a constitution providing for self-government was promulgated.

In the 1960s, politics in the territory were largely dominated by descendants of the ruling families of the precolonial sultanate. This group was conservative and pro-French. In this period, two main political parties emerged - the Parti Vert (Green Party), later known as the Comoros Democratic Union , and the Parti Blanc (White Party), later known as the Democratic Assembly of the Comoran People.

Dr. Said Mohamed Cheikh, president of the Parti Vert and of the Governing Council, was, until his death in 1970, the most important political leader in the islands. The Parti Blanc, under Prince Said Ibrahim, was in the opposition, supported progressive policies including land reform and weakening foreign monopoly on Comoran cash crops.

Independence movement 
In 1962, Comoran expatriates in Tanzania established the National Liberation Movement of Comoros (Mouvement de la Libération Nationale des Comores - MOLINACO). Molinaco actively promoted Comoran independence abroad, especially in the Organization of African Unity (OAU).

An increasing number of Comorans, particularly younger ones, resentful about perceived French neglect of the islands, began to support independence. The ruling elite, although pro-French, began to view independence as a "regrettable necessity". In 1972, leaders of the Parti Vert and the Parti Blanc agreed to push for independence, while aspiring to maintain good relations with France.

1974 Referendum 

An independence referendum was held on December 22, 1974 in the four islands. Three of the islands voted for independence, but Mayotte chose to remain as a French department:

Independence 
In spite of a 1973 agreement with France that independence would be granted in 1973, the Comorian parliament passed a resolution on July 6, 1975 declaring unilateral independence. The deputies of Mayotte abstained from the vote. The French government recognised the independence of Grande Comore, Anjouan and Mohéli on 31 December 1975, but did not mention Mayotte. A referendum was subsequently held in Mayotte in February 1976 on remaining part of the Comoros. The proposal was rejected by over 99% of voters, with voter turnout at 83.34%.

Economy 

The economy of the Comoro islands was dominated by the Société Comores Bambao, which managed the majority of the archipelago's arable land and possessed a monopoly on establishing all non-indigenous companies. By the 1960s, the Comoros were no longer food self-sufficient, as food represented 30% to 35% of all imports.

The French and local leading citizens established plantations to grow cash crops for export, and the economy was dominated by French companies such as Société Bambao and Établissements Grimaldi. These firms would divert most of their profits overseas, with little investment in the islands' development beyond what was needed for managing the plantations. A serious consequence of this approach has been the languishing of the food-crop agricultural sector and the resultant dependence on overseas food imports, particularly rice.

References 

History of the Comoros by period
20th century in the Comoros
Comoros